The Rajkot - Porbandar Fast Passenger is a passenger train belonging to Western Railway zone that runs between Porbandar and Rajkot Junction. It is currently being operated with 59211/59212 train numbers on a daily basis.

Average speed and frequency 

The 59211/Rajkot Porbandar Fast Passenger runs with an average speed of 37 km/h and completes  216 km in 5h 50m. The 59212/Porbandar Rajkot Fast Passenger runs with an average speed of 37 km/h and completes  216 km in 5h 50m.

Route and halts 

The important halts of the train are:

Coach composite

The train has standard ICF rakes with max speed of 110 kmph. The train consists of 8 coaches:

 6 General Unreserved
 2 Seating cum Luggage Rake

Traction

Both trains are hauled by a Ratlam Loco Shed based WDM 3A diesel locomotive from Muzaffarpur to Porbandar and vice versa.

Direction Reversal

Train Reverses its direction 1 times:

See also 

 Porbandar railway station
 Rajkot Junction railway station
 Rajkot - Porbandar Express

Notes

References

External links 

 59211/Rajkot - Porbandar Fast Passenger
 59212/Porbandar - Rajkot Fast Passenger

Transport in Rajkot
Transport in Porbandar
Rail transport in Gujarat
Slow and fast passenger trains in India